Myrick's Mill is a populated place in Twiggs County, Georgia,. Originally known as Big Sandy, for a large creek in the area, the settlement included a post office, churches, sawmills, ice house and J.D. Myrick's grist mill. Residents produced cotton, fruits and vegetables. The site was added to the National Register of Historic Places on December 6, 1975. The settlement was located northeast of Fitzpatrick, Georgia on county road 378.

A  area including the mill and associated dam was listed on the National Register of Historic Places in 1975.  It included one contributing building (the mill) and three contributing structures.

In 1975, the mill was reported to be in "a fair, largely unaltered condition" and "one of the few remaining mills in Georgia dating from antebellum times", but the mill has apparently since been demolished.

See also
National Register of Historic Places listings in Twiggs County, Georgia

References

Buildings and structures in Twiggs County, Georgia
Industrial buildings and structures on the National Register of Historic Places in Georgia (U.S. state)
National Register of Historic Places in Twiggs County, Georgia
Buildings and structures completed in 1840